Haradzeya is an urban-type settlement in Belarus, located in the Nyasvizh District of Minsk Region.

History

The first known documental record of the village dates back to 1530. Horodziej was a privately owned village located in the Nowogródek County of the Nowogródek Voivodeship of the Polish–Lithuanian Commonwealth until the Second Partition of Poland (1793) when it was annexed by Tsarist Russia. Initially, the village often changed owners, before it became the property of the powerful Radziwiłł family in 1575. A Roman Catholic church was built in the 17th century.

The village was briefly occupied by the Germans in 1918 and after Poland regained independence (1918) it came under Polish administration in 1919 and was finally reintegrated with Polish territory after the Polish-Soviet War (1919–1921). Administratively Horodziej was part of the Nowogródek Voivodeship. After the destruction of World War I, a new Catholic church and a new railway station were built.

Before World War II, the precise number of Jews living in Horodziej is not known, but it was probably somewhere between 700 and 1,000, the third of the total population. After the invasion of Poland the village was under Soviet occupation from 1939 to 1941, German occupation from 1941 to 1944 and again Soviet occupation from 1944 to 1945, when in accordance to the Potsdam Agreement it was taken from Poland and annexed to the Soviet Union.

In 1941, an enclosed ghetto of a few houses was established. On July 16, 1942, the ghetto was liquidated. Some Jews were transported in trucks, but most were marched on foot, to a small hill near the Christian cemetery, where a pit had been dug. On the way to the killing site, the guards shot several Jews who were unable to keep up. Approximately 1,000 Jews were shot that day by an Einsatzgruppen. Earlier, in June 1942, local Polish parish priest Józef Gogoliński was arrested and imprisoned in nearby Nieśwież. He was later murdered along with 3 other priests as part of the continuation of the anti-Polish Intelligenzaktion.

In 1946 the Roman Catholic St. Joseph church was closed down by the Soviets. It was reopened and renovated in the 1990s after the dissolution of the Soviet Union.

Sights 

The historic sights include a chapel built in 1874, a pre-war Polish Roman Catholic Church of St. Joseph, a 19th-century Orthodox Church of the Transfiguration and old houses. There is also a Battle of Grunwald memorial stone and a memorial complex dedicated to the local Jews murdered during the Holocaust.

Transport 
A railway station is located in the settlement.

Sports 
FC Gorodeya football club is based in the settlement.

Notable residents 
 

 Kastus Moskalik (1918–2010), Belarusian Greek Catholic priest
 Alexander Nadson (1926–2015), the Apostolic Visitor for Belarusian Greek-Catholic faithful abroad, scholar, translator and a notable Belarusian émigré social and religious leader.

References

External links

Selected places at Haradzeya 

Urban-type settlements in Belarus
Populated places in Minsk Region
Nyasvizh District
Novogrudsky Uyezd
Nowogródek Voivodeship (1919–1939)
Jewish Belarusian history
Holocaust locations in Belarus